Stef Van Zummeren (born 20 December 1991 in Turnhout) is a Belgian former professional cyclist.

Major results

2013
 2nd Antwerpse Havenpijl
2014
 1st  Mountains classification Tour de Normandie
2015
 1st Circuit de Wallonie
 2nd Handzame Challenge
 5th Overall Paris–Arras Tour
1st Stage 1 (TTT)
 8th Overall Circuit des Ardennes
 8th Duo Normand (with Kai Reus)
 9th Grote Prijs Stad Zottegem

References

External links

1991 births
Living people
Belgian male cyclists
Sportspeople from Turnhout
Cyclists from Antwerp Province
21st-century Belgian people